The Mittaggüpfi (also known as Gnepfstein) is a mountain of the Emmental Alps, located west of the mountain of Pilatus on the border between the Swiss cantons of Lucerne and Obwalden.

References

External links
 Mittaggüpfi on Hikr

Mountains of the Alps
Mountains of Obwalden
Mountains of the canton of Lucerne
Lucerne–Obwalden border
Emmental Alps
Mountains of Switzerland